Horimono (literally carving, engraving), also known as chōkoku ("sculpture"), are the engraved images in the blade of a nihonto Japanese sword, which may include katana or tantō blades. The artist is called a chōkokushi, or a horimonoshi ("engraver"). There are a variety of designs, which include tsume  "claws", kusa kurikara (Arabesque style), Munenagabori (created in Munenaga), renge (lotus blossom) and rendai (lotus pedestal), fruit, dragons, and many others.

Tattooing
Horimono can also refer to the practice of traditional tattooing in Japanese culture; while irezumi usually refers to any tattooing (and often has negative connotations in Japan), "horimono" is usually used to describe full-body tattoos done in the traditional style.  In some cases, these tattoos can cover the whole body, including the arms and legs.

This type of tattoo is traditionally done using a tebori (手彫り) - an instrument constructed of a bundle of needles affixed to a bamboo rod. Public knowledge on this style of tattooing is limited, and one must enter an apprenticeship under a master in order to learn.

Gallery

See also 
 Hajichi

References

External links 
 Image of blades with Horimono
 Image of Horimono Blade
 So-ken Kin-ko To-shin Cho-koku  Katayama Shigetsune
 Modern engraved blades pictures

Japanese swords
Japanese tattooing